Abu Fazel (also Romanized as Abū Fāzel; also known as Abū Fāẕel-e Zargān, Ālbū Fāzel, Bufāzil, and Zargān-e Abū Fāẕel) is a village in Veys Rural District, Veys District, Bavi County, Khuzestan Province, Iran. At the 2006 census, its population was 841, in 117 families.

References 

Populated places in Bavi County